= Adelomyarion =

Adelomyarion Temporal range: Late Oligocene

Scientific classification
- Kingdom: Animalia
- Phylum: Chordata
- Class: Mammalia
- Order: Rodentia
- Family: Cricetidae
- Genus: †Adelomyarion; Hugueney, 1969

Type species
- Adelomyarion vireti Hugueney, 1969

Other species
- Adelomyarion alberti Daams, 1989

Extinct genus of cricetid rodent

Adelomyarion is an extinct genus of cricetid rodent that lived in Europe during the Chattian stage of the Oligocene epoch.

== Distribution ==
Adelomyarion vireti, the type species of the genus, is known from Germany, Switzerland, France, and Spain. Adelomyarion alberti is known only from Spain.
